Sucun Township is a township under the administration of Lingbao, in western Henan province, China, located  south of downtown Lingbao in the Qin Mountains. As of 2011, it has 32 villages under its administration.

References

Township-level divisions of Henan